The 1987 NAIA World Series was the 31st annual tournament hosted by the National Association of Intercollegiate Athletics to determine the national champion of baseball among its member colleges and universities in the United States and Canada.

The tournament was played at Harris Field in Lewiston, Idaho.

Hometown team Lewis–Clark State (55–10) defeated Emporia State (55–11) in a single-game championship series, 11–4, to win the Warriors' third NAIA World Series. Not only was this Lewis–Clark State's third title in four seasons but it would also go on to be the first of six consecutive World Series championships for the program.

Lewis–Clark State outfielder Pat Mackey was named tournament MVP.

Bracket

Preliminary bracket

Championship bracket

See also
 1987 NCAA Division I baseball tournament
 1987 NCAA Division II baseball tournament
 1987 NCAA Division III baseball tournament
 1987 NAIA Softball World Series

Reference

|NAIA World Series
NAIA World Series
NAIA World Series
NAIA World Series